The 1983–84 season was the 82nd season in which Dundee competed at a Scottish national level, playing in the Scottish Premier Division. Dundee would finish in 8th place. Dundee would also compete in both the Scottish League Cup and the Scottish Cup, where they would be knocked out in the group stage of the League Cup, and would make it to the semi-finals of the Scottish Cup before being defeated by Aberdeen.

Scottish Premier Division 

Statistics provided by Dee Archive.

League table

Scottish League Cup 

Statistics provided by Dee Archive.

Knockout stage

Group 3

Group 3 table

Scottish Cup 

Statistics provided by Dee Archive.

Player statistics 
Statistics provided by Dee Archive

|}

See also 

 List of Dundee F.C. seasons

References

External links 

 1983–84 Dundee season on Fitbastats

Dundee F.C. seasons
Dundee